A Very Special Christmas 3 is the third in the A Very Special Christmas series of Christmas-themed compilation albums produced to benefit the Special Olympics. The album was released on 23 September 1997, and production was overseen by Bobby Shriver, Al Cafaro, and Linda Feder for A&M Records.

Track listing

Charts

Weekly charts

Year-end charts

Certifications

References
[ Chart] at Allmusic

External links
 A Very Special Christmas 3 at Amazon.com
 A Very Special Christmas 3 at Discogs
Special Olympics: A Very Special Christmas

1997 Christmas albums
A&M Records compilation albums
A Very Special Christmas